In BDSM terms, a zipper is a string of clothespins or other clips, held together loosely by a cord or light chain.

The skin is clipped in the clips for a short time, then the cord is pulled, causing the clips to be pulled off the skin one by one in rapid sequence causing a unique sensation. Zippers come in many sizes and with varied numbers of clips. They are a very popular home-made BDSM toy.

References

BDSM equipment